Robert Angelo Peter Lozowski (born 18 November 1960) is an English former rugby union player. He played for Wasps, and was capped by England  in 1984 against Australia. He played 263 1st XV games for Wasps and was club captain in the 1988/89 season. He also played for the Barbarians whom he captained against Swansea in 1990. He also represented England at Under 23 and 'A' level between 1984 and 1990. His son Alex is currently a professional rugby player at Saracens.

References

1960 births
Living people
English rugby union players
England international rugby union players
Wasps RFC players
Barbarian F.C. players
Rugby union centres
Middlesex County RFU players